Aaron Matthew Taylor (born November 14, 1972) is a former professional American football player who was an offensive guard in the National Football League (NFL) for six seasons.  He played college football for the University of Notre Dame and was a two-time All-American.  A first-round pick in the 1994 NFL Draft, he played professionally for the Green Bay Packers and the San Diego Chargers of the NFL.  Taylor works as a college football analyst and television sportscaster. He is the Founder of the Joe Moore Award for the most outstanding offensive line unit in college football - the only major college football award going to a group versus an individual. Aaron Taylor is a speaker on teamwork and performance at summits, events, corporate retreats, universities. In 2021, Taylor was inducted into the College Football Hall of Fame

Early years
Taylor was born in San Francisco, California.  He graduated from De La Salle High School in Concord, California, where he played high school football for the De La Salle Spartans.

College career
He attended the University of Notre Dame, and played offensive tackle for the Notre Dame Fighting Irish football team from 1990 to 1993.  He was a consensus first-team All-American in 1992 and 1993 and won the Lombardi Award in 1993.  He was also a senior team captain and an Outland Trophy finalist in 1993.

Professional career
Taylor's promising career was repeatedly interrupted by knee injuries, but he won a starting job at guard and played in two Super Bowls with the Packers, including the Packers' 1997 championship win in Super Bowl XXXI.

Post-playing career
Taylor works as a college football analyst for CBS Sports Network.  He previously worked as an analyst for ABC Sports, and as co-host of the network's college football coverage with John Saunders and Craig James. Taylor provides color commentary for CBSSN's coverage of the World's Strongest Man competition. He is married to Bulgarian Olympic beach volleyball player Lina Yanchulova, and has two sons and a daughter.

References

1972 births
Living people
All-American college football players
American football offensive guards
Green Bay Packers players
Notre Dame Fighting Irish football players
People from Concord, California
Sportspeople from the San Francisco Bay Area
San Diego Chargers players
College football announcers
Players of American football from California
De La Salle High School (Concord, California) alumni